Anthorrhiza is a genus of myrmecophytic flowering plants in the family Rubiaceae. It is endemic to Papua New Guinea, including the Louisiade Archipelago. It is one of five ant-plant genera in the family Rubiaceae, the others being Hydnophytum, Myrmecodia, Myrmephytum, and Squamellaria.

Species 
 Anthorrhiza areolata C.R.Huxley & Jebb
 Anthorrhiza bracteosa C.R.Huxley & Jebb
 Anthorrhiza caerulea C.R.Huxley & Jebb
 Anthorrhiza camilla Jebb
 Anthorrhiza chrysacantha C.R.Huxley & Jebb
 Anthorrhiza echinella C.R.Huxley & Jebb
 Anthorrhiza mitis C.R.Huxley & Jebb
 Anthorrhiza recurvispina C.R.Huxley & Jebb
 Anthorrhiza stevensii C.R.Huxley & Jebb

References 

Rubiaceae genera
Psychotrieae
Myrmecophytes
Endemic flora of New Guinea